Barker Bros. was a major Los Angeles-based retailer of furniture, home furnishings, and housewares. Founded as Barker and Mueller in 1880, the business operated under various names through 1992.

History
Obadiah Truax Barker had owned upholstery and mattress shops in Cincinnati, Ohio, and Grand Rapids, Michigan.

In 1880, Barker was visiting Los Angeles on a trip from Colorado Springs to San Jose, California, when he overheard an outraged Otto Müller at a horticultural exhibition complain about the high cost of furnishing his home from the only large furniture store in the city at the time. Barker approached Müller and together they founded a furniture shop on N. Spring Street near the Los Angeles Plaza, called Barker and Mueller. 

In 1880, Los Angeles was a town with a population of 11,183. Its population would increase tenfold in the next twenty years, and tenfold again, to over one million, in the 25 years after that.

In 1883, Barker bought out Müller and went into partnership with W. S. Allen, forming Barker & Allen, and moved to the Merced Theatre Building at 8–10 Main Street (pre-1890 numbering), also just off the Los Angeles Plaza. Barker bought out Allen that same year and the firm became O. T. Barker & Sons.

Later the store moved to 3rd & Spring streets at the Stimson Building, Los Angeles' first steel-frame building, where their rent of $1500 was ten times what they had paid on Main Street, a sign of the rapid growth of Los Angeles at the time. 

Again they moved – the move was done overnight and widely reported – this time to the seven-story Van Nuys building at 716–738 S. Broadway, the area which is now known as the Historic Core, the part of Broadway that was the main commercial street of Los Angeles from around 1910 until World War Two.

1926 flagship store
A 1931 article reported that they employed 1,444 people (including 432 women).

Branches
The company launched branch stores across Greater Los Angeles and in Bakersfield, with 15 branches by 1955: Hollywood opened in 1927, Long Beach in 1929, plus Glendale, Inglewood, Huntington Park, Santa Monica, Alhambra, Pasadena, Crenshaw, Westwood, Pomona, Van Nuys, Burbank, Santa Ana, Whittier, and Bakersfield, plus a decorator store in Beverly Hills. The company had sales of $30 million at that time, with two-thirds coming from the downtown flagship.

Epilogue
The Downtown flagship closed September 24, 1984. Prisma Capital acquired the company in a leveraged buyout and, having taken on too much debt, caused Barker Bros. to go bankrupt and close in 1992.

External links
1926 store directory

References

Defunct department stores based in Greater Los Angeles
Furniture retailers of the United States
1880 establishments in California
1992 disestablishments in California
Companies based in Los Angeles
Retail companies established in 1880
Retail companies disestablished in 1992